Sulfolobus islandicus rod-shaped virus 1 (SIRV1) is a virus in the order Ligamenvirales.  Its only known host is the Archaean Sulfolobus islandicus. The species was first documented from a hot spring sample in Yellowstone National Park.

References

Archaeal viruses
Ligamenvirales